Park Lee-chun (born July 26, 1947) is former South Korean football player and manager. He played for the South Korea national football team from 1969 to 1974. In the 1972 AFC Asian Cup, he scored four goals and led South Korea to become runners-up. After retirement, he managed South Korean under-20 team in the 1997 FIFA World Youth Championship.

Honours 
Yangzee
Korean National Championship: 1968
Korean President's Cup: 1968
Asian Champion Club Tournament runner-up: 1969

ROK Army
Korean National Championship: 1970
Korean President's Cup: 1971

Kookmin Bank
Korean President's Cup: 1973

South Korea
Asian Games: 1970
AFC Asian Cup runner-up: 1972

Individual
Korean FA Best XI: 1970, 1971, 1972, 1973, 1974
Korean FA Player of the Year: 1972
KASA Best Korean Footballer: 1972

References

External links 
 Park Lee-chun – National Team Stats at KFA 

1947 births
Living people
Association football forwards
South Korean footballers
South Korean expatriate footballers
South Korea international footballers
Goyang KB Kookmin Bank FC players
South China AA players
Hong Kong First Division League players
South Korean football managers
Incheon United FC managers
Expatriate footballers in Hong Kong
South Korean expatriate sportspeople in Hong Kong
1972 AFC Asian Cup players
Chung-Ang University alumni
Sea Bee players
Asian Games medalists in football
Footballers at the 1970 Asian Games
Asian Games gold medalists for South Korea
Medalists at the 1970 Asian Games